Grantsburg is an unincorporated community in Union Township, Crawford County, Indiana.

History
Grantsburg was laid out in 1854.

The Grantsburg post office (spelled Grantsburgh in early years) was established in 1854. John V. Grant was an early postmaster.

Geography

References

Unincorporated communities in Crawford County, Indiana
Unincorporated communities in Indiana